This is a list of destinations served by Trans World Airlines (TWA) at the time of its closure. It was taken over by American Airlines in 2001. Destinations served by Trans World Express and Trans World Connection (as American Eagle) do not appear here.

List

Africa 
 
 Cairo - Cairo International Airport

Americas

Caribbean 
 
 St. John's - V.C. Bird International Airport
  
 Oranjestad - Queen Beatrix International Airport
 
 Freeport - Grand Bahama International Airport
 Nassau - Nassau International Airport
  
 Puerto Plata - Gregorio Luperón International Airport
 Punta Cana - Punta Cana International Airport
 Santo Domingo - Las Américas International Airport
 
 Montego Bay - Sangster International Airport
  (now Sint Maarten)
 Philipsburg - Princess Juliana International Airport Seasonal
 
 San Juan - Luis Muñoz Marín International Airport Hub
  Port of Spain - Piarco International Airport
  Providenciales - Providenciales International Airport
 St. Lucia-Hewannora

 North America 
  Toronto - Toronto Pearson International Airport
 Vancouver - Vancouver International Airport
  Cancún - Cancún International Airport
  Alaska Anchorage - Ted Stevens International Airport
 Arizona Phoenix - Sky Harbor International Airport
 Arkansas Little Rock - Little Rock National Airport
 California Los Angeles - Los Angeles International Airport Hub Ontario - LA/Ontario International Airport
 Sacramento - Sacramento International Airport
 San Diego - San Diego International Airport
 San Francisco - San Francisco International Airport
 San Jose - San Jose International Airport
 Santa Ana/Orange County - John Wayne Airport
 Colorado Colorado Springs - Colorado Springs Airport
 Denver - Denver International Airport
 Hayden/Steamboat Springs - Yampa Valley Airport Seasonal
 Connecticut Hartford - Bradley International Airport
 Florida Fort Lauderdale - Fort Lauderdale–Hollywood International Airport
 Fort Myers - Southwest Florida Regional Airport
 Jacksonville - Jacksonville International Airport
 Miami - Miami International Airport
 Orlando - Orlando International Airport
 Tampa - Tampa International Airport
 Georgia Atlanta - William B. Hartsfield International Airport
 Hawaii Honolulu - Honolulu International Airport
 Kona - Kona International Airport
 Maui - Kahului International Airport
 Illinois Chicago - O'Hare International Airport
 Moline - Quad City International Airport
 Indiana Indianapolis - Indianapolis International Airport
 Iowa Cedar Rapids - The Eastern Iowa Airport
 Des Moines - Des Moines International Airport
 Kansas Wichita - Wichita Mid–Continent Airport
 Kentucky Louisville - Louisville International Airport
 Louisiana New Orleans - Louis Armstrong International Airport
 Maine Portland - Portland International Jetport
 Maryland Baltimore - Baltimore/Washington International Airport
 Massachusetts Boston - Logan International Airport
 Michigan Detroit - Detroit Metropolitan Airport
 Minnesota Minneapolis/St. Paul - Minneapolis–Saint Paul International Airport
 Missouri Kansas City - Kansas City International Airport
 Springfield/Branson - Springfield–Branson National Airport
 St. Louis - Lambert–St. Louis International Airport Hub Nebraska Lincoln - Lincoln Airport
 Omaha - Eppley Airfield
 Nevada Las Vegas - McCarran International Airport
 New Mexico Albuquerque - Albuquerque International Sunport
 New Jersey Newark - Newark Liberty International Airport
 New York New York City
 John F. Kennedy International Airport Hub LaGuardia Airport
 North Carolina Charlotte - Charlotte Douglas International Airport
 Raleigh/Durham - Raleigh–Durham International Airport
 Ohio Cleveland - Hopkins International Airport
 Columbus - Port Columbus International Airport
 Dayton - Dayton International Airport
 Oklahoma Oklahoma City - Will Rogers World Airport
 Tulsa - Tulsa International Airport
 Oregon Portland - Portland International Airport
 Pennsylvania Philadelphia - Philadelphia International Airport
 Pittsburgh - Pittsburgh International Airport
 South Dakota Sioux Falls - Sioux Falls Regional Airport
 Tennessee Nashville - Nashville International Airport
 Texas Austin - Austin–Bergstrom International Airport
 Dallas/Fort Worth - Dallas/Fort Worth International Airport
 El Paso/Ciudad Juárez/Las Cruces - El Paso International Airport
 Houston - George Bush Intercontinental Airport
 McAllen - McAllen International Airport
 San Antonio - San Antonio International Airport
 Utah Salt Lake City - Salt Lake City International Airport
 Virginia Norfolk/Virginia Beach/Williamsburg - Norfolk International Airport
 Richmond - Richmond International Airport
 Washington, D.C. Washington Dulles International Airport
 Ronald Reagan Washington National Airport
 Washington Seattle - Seattle–Tacoma International Airport
 Wisconsin Milwaukee - General Mitchell International Airport

 Asia 
 Northeast Asia 
  Shanghai - Shanghai Hongqiao International Airport
  Hong Kong - Kai Tak Airport
  Tokyo
 Tokyo International Airport
 Narita International Airport
 Okinawa - Naha Airport
  Taipei - Songshan Airport

 Southeast Asia 
  Manila - Ninoy Aquino International Airport
  Bangkok - Don Mueang International Airport

 South Asia 
  Mumbai - Chhatrapati Shivaji Maharaj International Airport
  Colombo - Bandaranaike International Airport

 West Asia 
  Tel Aviv - Ben Gurion Airport
  Kuwait City - Kuwait international Airport

 Europe 
 Central Europe 
  Vienna - Vienna International Airport
  Geneva - Geneva Airport
 Zürich - Zürich Airport

 Northern Europe 
  Copenhagen - Copenhagen Airport
  Helsinki - Helsinki Airport
  Oslo - Oslo Fornebu Airport
  Stockholm - Stockholm Arlanda Airport

 Southern Europe 
  Athens - Ellinikon International Airport
  Milan - Milan Malpensa Airport
 Rome - Leonardo da Vinci–Fiumicino Airport
  Lisbon - Lisbon Portela Airport
 Santa Maria Island - Santa Maria Airport
 Terceira - Lajes Airport
  Barcelona - Josep Tarradellas Barcelona–El Prat Airport
 Madrid - Adolfo Suárez Madrid–Barajas Airport
 Málaga - Málaga Airport
  Istanbul - Istanbul Atatürk Airport

 Western Europe 
  Brussels - Brussels Airport
  Nice - Nice Côte d'Azur Airport
 Paris - Charles de Gaulle Airport
  Berlin
 Berlin Schönefeld Airport
 Berlin Tegel Airport
 Berlin Tempelhof Airport
 Frankfurt - Frankfurt Airport
 Hamburg - Hamburg Airport
 Munich - Munich-Riem Airport
 Stuttgart - Stuttgart Airport
  Dublin - Dublin Airport
 Shannon - Shannon Airport
  Amsterdam - Amsterdam Airport Schiphol
  London
 Gatwick Airport
 Heathrow Airport

 Terminated destinations before closure 
 Africa 
 East Africa 
  Nairobi - Jomo Kenyatta International Airport
  Dar es Salaam - Julius Nyerere International Airport
  Entebbe - Entebbe International Airport

 North Africa 
  Algiers - Houari Boumediene Airport
  Tripoli - Tripoli International Airport
  Casablanca - Mohammed V International Airport
  Tunis - Tunis–Carthage International Airport

 Americas 
 Caribbean 
  
 St. David's - L.F. Wade International Airport
  Aguadilla - Rafael Hernández Airport

 North America 
  Toronto - Toronto Island Airport (service transferred to Trans World Express)Northeast USA destinations in 2000 , Trans World Airlines
  Cozumel - Cozumel International Airport Seasonal
 Ixtapa - Ixtapa-Zihuatanejo International Airport Seasonal
 Mexico City - Mexico City International Airport
 Puerto Vallarta - Licenciado Gustavo Díaz Ordaz International Airport Seasonal
  Arizona Grand Canyon - Grand Canyon Airport
 Kingman - Kingman Airport (closed)
 Prescott - Ernest A. Love Field
 Tucson - Tucson International Airport
 Winslow - Winslow–Lindbergh Regional Airport
 California Burbank - Hollywood Burbank Airport
 Fresno - Fresno Yosemite International Airport
 Long Beach - Long Beach Airport
 Los Angeles - Grand Central Airport (closed 1959)TWA Ford Tri-Motor at Grand Central Airport, Glendale, CA, 1930.
 Oakland - Oakland International Airport
 Palm Springs - Palm Springs International AirportNorth America in 1998 , Trans World Airlines
 San Francisco - San Francisco Bay Airdrome (closed 1941)TWA timetable, 15 June 1931.
 Colorado Denver - Stapleton International Airport (closed 1995)
 Pueblo - Pueblo Memorial Airport
 Delaware Wilmington - Wilmington Airport
 Florida Sarasota - Sarasota–Bradenton International Airport
 West Palm Beach - Palm Beach International Airport
 Illinois Champaign - University of Illinois Willard Airport
 Chicago - Midway International Airport
 Peoria - General Wayne A. Downing Peoria International Airport (transferred to Trans World Express)
 Quincy - Quincy Regional Airport
 Rockford - Chicago Rockford International Airport
 Indiana Fort Wayne - Fort Wayne International Airport 
 Richmond - Richmond Municipal Airport
 South Bend - South Bend International Airport
 Terre Haute - Terre Haute Regional Airport
 Iowa Sioux City - Sioux Gateway Airport (transferred to Trans World Express)
 Waterloo - Waterloo Regional Airport (transferred to Trans World Express)
 Kansas Topeka - Topeka Regional AirportKentucky Cincinnati - Cincinnati-Northern Kentucky International Airport (transferred to Trans World Express)
 Lexington - Blue Grass Airport
 Louisiana Shreveport - Shreveport Regional Airport (transferred to Trans World Express)
 Maine Portland - Portland International Jetport
 Massachusetts Worcester - Worcester Regional Airport
 Minnesota Rochester - Rochester International Airport (transferred to Trans World Express)
 Mississippi Jackson - Jackson-Evers International Airport
 Nevada Boulder City - Boulder City Airport
 Reno - Reno–Tahoe International Airport
 New Jersey Camden County - Camden Central Airport (closed 1957)
 New Mexico Santa Fe - Santa Fe Municipal Airport
 New York Albany - Albany International Airport
 Binghamton - Greater Binghamton Airport
 Buffalo - Buffalo-Lancaster Regional Airport
 Syracuse - Syracuse Hancock International Airport (At the time of TWA's closure in 2001, Trans World Connection operated the route.)
 North Carolina Greensboro - Piedmont Triad International Airport
 Ohio Mansfield - Mansfield Lahm Regional Airport
 Marion - Marion Municipal Airport
 Springfield - Springfield-Beckley Municipal Airport
 Toledo - Toledo Express Airport
 Zanesville - Zanesville Municipal Airport
 Pennsylvania Allentown - Lehigh Valley International Airport
 Harrisburg - Harrisburg International Airport
 Johnstown - Johnstown–Cambria County Airport
 Lancaster - Lancaster Airport
 Reading - Reading Regional Airport
 Wilkes-Barre - Wilkes-Barre/Scranton International Airport
 Williamsport - Williamsport Regional Airport
 Rhode Island Providence - Providence Airport
 Tennessee Knoxville - McGhee Tyson Airport
 Memphis - Memphis International Airport (transferred to Trans World Express)Route Map, Jan. 1, 1987. See also TWA Timetable, 1 Jun. 1986. 83: flight 317 Memphis-St. Louis. 
 Texas Amarillo - Rick Husband Amarillo International Airport
 El Paso - El Paso International Airport
 Houston - William P. Hobby Airport (served till October 25, 1998)
 West Virginia Wheeling - Wheeling Ohio County Airport
 Wisconsin Madison - Dane County Regional Airport (transferred to Trans World Express)

 Asia 
 Southeast Asia 
  Denpasar - Ngurah Rai International Airport

 West Asia 
  Manama - Bahrain International Airport1975 Timetable, Trans World AirlinesEurope in 1999 , Trans World Airlines
  Basra - Basra International Airport
  Dhahran - Dhahran International Airport

 Oceania 
 '''
 Agana - Antonio B. Won Pat International Airport

References

Trans World Airlines
Lists of airline destinations